The 2018 Bolivian Primera División season was the 41st season of Bolivia's top-flight football league and the first season under División de Fútbol Profesional management. Bolívar were the defending champions, having won the 2017 Clausura tournament.

In the Torneo Apertura, Jorge Wilstermann won their fourteenth league title, and seventh in the professional era, after beating The Strongest on penalties in the third and last match of the finals on 6 June, and San José won their fourth league title in the Torneo Clausura on 19 December after tying with Royal Pari by a 1–1 score.

Format
Given that the league was expanded from 12 to 14 teams, the league format had a slight variation for this season. The Torneo Apertura was played in the first half of the year, with the 14 teams being split into two groups of seven teams each for the first stage, in which teams in each group played each other as well as a team from the other group (their derby rival) twice, for a total of 14 matches. The top four teams from each group qualified for the knockout stage, where they were sorted in four ties played on a home-and-away basis, with the four winners advancing to the semifinals and the winners of each semifinal advancing to the final of the tournament. The six teams that failed to qualify for the knockout stage played another separate knockout tournament for a berth to the Copa Sudamericana. On the other hand, the Torneo Clausura was played in the second half of the year under a double round-robin system, with all teams playing each other twice for a total of 26 matches.

International qualification was as follows: the champions and runners-up of each tournament qualified for the 2019 Copa Libertadores, while the third-placed team in each tournament, as well as the fourth-placed in the Clausura and the winners of the Apertura's secondary knockout tournament would qualify for the 2019 Copa Sudamericana.

Teams
The number of teams for the 2018 season was increased by two, from twelve to fourteen. Aurora and Royal Pari were promoted to the top flight after winning the 2016–17 Copa Simón Bolívar and 2017 Copa Simón Bolívar, respectively. Petrolero was relegated to the ATF Championship after losing the relegation playoff to Destroyers, the 2016–17 Copa Simón Bolívar runner-up.

a: Aurora and Jorge Wilstermann played their Torneo Apertura home games at Estadio Capitán José Angulo in Sacaba due to the closure of Estadio Félix Capriles in preparation of the 2018 South American Games. Aurora played its Torneo Apertura home match against Jorge Wilstermann at Estadio Evo Morales in Ivirgarzama.
b: Guabirá played six of their seven home games in the Torneo Apertura first stage at Estadio Ramón Tahuichi Aguilera in Santa Cruz de la Sierra and Estadio Samuel Vaca in Warnes while their regular stadium Estadio Gilberto Parada underwent remodeling works.

Managerial changes

Torneo Apertura
The Torneo Apertura began on 27 January and ended on 6 June.

Standings

Serie A

Serie B

Results

Championship playoff

Quarterfinals

Semifinals

Third place play-off

Finals

Copa Sudamericana playoff

Quarterfinals

Semifinals

Finals

Top goalscorers

Source: LFPB

Torneo Clausura

Standings

Results

Top goalscorers

Source: Soccerway

Aggregate table
The aggregate table was elaborated considering the results in the Torneo Apertura (only the first stage) and the Torneo Clausura. The bottom-placed team in this table at the end of the season was relegated, while the next lowest placed team played the relegation playoff. In addition to this, all international qualification berths left vacant at the end of the season were allocated through this table.

Relegation/promotion playoff
The relegation playoff was played between:
 Destroyers (2018 División Profesional aggregate table 13th place)
 Avilés Industrial (2018 Copa Simón Bolívar runners-up)

The winners will play in the top flight for the 2019 season.

Destroyers won 6–0 on points.

References

External links
 Official website of the LFPB 

2018
2018 in South American football leagues
1
2018 in Bolivian sport